Walter Porter (30 August 1903 - 3 August 1979) was a British athlete who competed at the 1924 Summer Olympics.

References

1903 births
1979 deaths
Sportspeople from York
Athletes (track and field) at the 1924 Summer Olympics
British male middle-distance runners
Olympic athletes of Great Britain
Olympic silver medallists for Great Britain
Medalists at the 1924 Summer Olympics
Olympic silver medalists in athletics (track and field)